Prathyusha Engineering College was founded in 2001 by Shri P. Raja Rao, and is located in Tamil Nadu, India. It offers engineering courses at undergraduate and postgraduate levels. The college is affiliated with Anna University.

History
Prathyusha Engineering College was established in the year 2001 under the aegis of Prathyusha Educational Trust founded by Sri.P. Raja Rao, Chairman, Prathyusha Group of Companies. It started with 6 courses. The institution has received recognition under section 2F/12B by UGC.
In 2012, the college inaugurated a new research and development centre.

Recognitions 
 2001-02: AICTE & Madras University 
 2002-03: Anna University Recognition
 2007-08: ISO quality system Implementation – ISO 9000:2000  
 2008-09: NBA Accreditation  - EEE, ECE , BIOTECH (3 years) 
 2012-13: Implementation of ISO 9001:2008 
 2013-14: Permanent Affiliation for all eligible branches – EEE, CSE, IT, BIOTECH, ECE 
 2014-15: Applied for NBA
 2015-16: UGC Recognition 2(F)& 12(B) 
 2016-17: NAAC accreditation with A Grade-3.13, Recognition of Animal House by Committee for the purpose of Control and Supervision on Experiments on Animals 
 2017-18: NBA accreditation for ECE, CSE, BioTech, EEE

References

External links
 
Chennai team comes second in Microsoft contest, The Hindu, 22 July 2010
Solar Energy Centre inaugurated, The New Indian Express, 13 November 2014

Colleges affiliated to Anna University
Education in Tiruvallur district
Educational institutions established in 1999
1999 establishments in Tamil Nadu